Wreck Small Speakers on Expensive Stereos was a band from New Zealand consisting of Michael Morley and Richard Ram. During the early 1980s they released numerous cassettes through the Wrecked Music and Every Secret Thing labels. In 1986 the Flying Nun label released their River Falling Love EP, which was reissued in 1993 by the Ajax Records label. The reissue featured bonus tracks culled from their earlier cassettes, some featuring vocals by Denise Roughan of Look Blue Go Purple.  Roughan later went on to form the 3Ds in the late eighties, while Morley went on to perform with The Dead C.

Discography

External links 
 Profile and Discography at The Big City
 [ AMG Entry]

New Zealand rock music groups
Flying Nun Records artists
Dunedin Sound musical groups